Schneider Rock is a rock 3 nautical miles (6 km) north of Siglin Rocks, protruding through the ice on the west side of Martin Peninsula, Bakutis Coast, in Marie Byrd Land. First photographed from the air by U.S. Navy Operation Highjump in January 1947. Named by Advisory Committee on Antarctic Names (US-ACAN) after Lieutenant R.P. Schneider, U.S. Navy, maintenance coordinator at the Williams Field air strip, McMurdo Sound, during Deep Freeze 1966.

Rock formations of Marie Byrd Land